The Wupper-Express (RE 4) is a Regional-Express service in the German state of North Rhine-Westphalia (NRW) running from Aachen via Mönchengladbach, Düsseldorf, Wuppertal, Hagen to Dortmund. The service is operated every hour by DB Regio NRW. It is the third most widely used Regional-Express line in the area administered by the Verkehrsverbund Rhein-Ruhr with approximately 24,000 passengers a day. The line is part of the Rhine-Ruhr Express (RRX) network an is operated by National Express.

History 

Today's RE 4 is the successor to the former StädteExpress line SE from Aachen to Hagen and Iserlohn. Later, the end point was moved to Hamm and after the abolition of InterRegio services it was extended to Munster. Under the second stage of North Rhine-Westphalia's integrated timetable (ITF 2), introduced in December 2002, it was replaced by the Maas-Wupper-Express (RE 13) and the Ems-Börde-Bahn (RB 89) services between Hagen and Munster and the Wupper-Express has since then run to Dortmund with a stop in Witten.

A reorganisation of services between Cologne and Dortmund is being undertaken in a program known as the Rhine-Ruhr Express (RRX).

Route
The Wupper-Express runs successively over the Aachen–Mönchengladbach, the Mönchengladbach–Düsseldorf and the Düsseldorf–Elberfeld lines. The service then follows the Elberfeld–Dortmund railway as far as Witten station, from where it uses the tracks of the Witten/Dortmund–Oberhausen/Duisburg railway and the Oberstraße Tunnel on its way to Dortmund station. At night, the RE 4 operates to Düsseldorf Airport Terminal station.

The Wupper-Express runs parallel to Rhine-Ruhr S-Bahn lines on large sections of track and it has some of the character of a fast S-Bahn service and is perceived by passengers accordingly.

Rollingstock
The Wupper-Express formerly used class 111 locomotives and non-air conditioned double-deck coaches. Additional peak hour services operated between Düsseldorf and Aachen with class 110 and 111 locomotives, operated exclusively with refurbished Silberling carriages. 

Since December 2020, the line has been operated by National Express with new Siemens Desiro HC EMU's in coupled sets, which serve as a reserve for possible expansions of the Rhein-Ruhr-Express lines.

See also
 List of regional rail lines in North Rhine-Westphalia
 List of scheduled railway routes in Germany

Notes

External links 

 

Rail services in North Rhine-Westphalia
Named DB Regio services